Glorioso Ventura Miranda (born October 8, 1961) is a retired Filipino soldier who is the former Vice Chief of Staff of the Armed Forces of the Philippines. He served as acting Chief of Staff of the Armed Forces of the Philippines from April 22 to June 30, 2016. Before becoming the 46th Vice Chief of Staff of the Armed Forces last March 8, 2016, he was the Commanding General of the AFP Northern Luzon Command from August 13, 2015. He was also the former commander of the 7th Infantry Division. He is part of the Matikas Class of the Philippine Military Academy of 1983. Currently, he has been appointed by President Rodrigo Duterte to the BCDA as a board member.

Early life and education 
Miranda was born in San Fernando, La Union on October 8, 1961. He entered Philippine Military Academy in 1979 and graduated in 1983. He finished Master in Business Administration at Isabela College on April 15, 1992. On January 26, 1996 he finished Project Management Executive Course at Asian Institute of Management in Makati. He obtained his master's degree in National Security Administration at National Defense College of the Philippines on August 31, 2007.

Training
Miranda completed various courses locally and abroad, such as the Scout Ranger Regular Course and the Basic Airborne Course in the 1st Scout Ranger Regiment, the Intelligence Office Basic Course, the Commando Course at Commando Training Centre Royal Marines in the United Kingdom, the Infantry Officer Advance Course at Singapore, the Command General Staff Course at the Armed Forces of the Philippines Command and General Staff College, and the Joint & Combined Staff Officers Course.

Military career 
 
Miranda became a battalion commander as he served as the commander of the 25th Infantry Battalion of the 10th Infantry Division, based within the Davao Region, and served as brigade commander of the 1002nd Infantry Brigade of the 10th Infantry Division, where he was promoted to the rank of Brigadier General. After, Miranda was named as the commander of the Armed Forces of the Philippines Command and General Staff College, where he earned his second star and became a Major General and served as the commander of the AFP General Headquarters & Headquarters Service Command (GHQ & HSC), both located in Camp Aguinaldo.

Miranda became a division commander as he served as the commander of the 7th Infantry Division from April 2, 2014 to August 13, 2015, and was named as a unified command commander as he serves as the commander of the AFP Northern Luzon Command from August 13, 2015 to March 8, 2016. Miranda was named as the Vice Chief of Staff of the Armed Forces of the Philippines, the AFP's second highest position from March 8, 2016 to January 12, 2017. On December 7, 2016, 9 months after being named the Vice Chief of Staff, Lieutenant General Miranda served as the Commanding General of the Philippine Army until October 5, 2017. As the Army's commanding general, he spearheaded the army's modernization programs and created new doctrines within the modern battlefield.

Battle of Marawi
During the Battle of Marawi, Miranda oversaw all army operations against the Maute group and the Abu Sayyaf terrorist groups, and launched an offensive operation within Marawi City and its outskirts. Lieutenant General Miranda also contributed to the creation of the Joint Task Force Marawi and initiated operations on May 24, 2017, a day after the firefight where the Maute and Abu Sayyaf groups engaged with AFP units in Basak Malutlut and in Camp Ranao, which was followed by the terrorist's takeover of the Amai Pakpak Medical Center. Miranda also created measures in launching urban operations and made initiatives to safeguard innocent civilians caught in the crossfire. He also crafted innovative measures against the terrorists, which includes the usage of installing wood and steel planks on the AFP's armored vehicles to protect the Army's armored vehicles against enemy RPGs and high caliber rifles. 

Miranda spent his last weeks in office as the Army's commanding general, he coordinated and finalized the AFP's final offensive within Marawi City and formally retired from military service on October 5, 2017. Miranda was replaced by then-division commander of the 1st Infantry Division Major General Rolando Joselito Bautista.

Awards
Miranda's awards include:
  Philippine Republic Presidential Unit Citation
  People Power I Unit Citation
  People Power II Unit Citation
  Commander, Philippine Legion of Honor
  One Distinguished Conduct Star
  Four Distinguished Service Stars
  Four Gold Cross Medal
  One Bronze Cross Medal
  One Long Service Medals
  Military Commendation Medal
  Military Merit Medal (Philippines)
  Military Civic Action Medal 
  Wounded Personnel Medal
  Parangal sa Kapanalig ng Sandatahang Lakas ng Pilipinas
  Anti-dissidence Campaign Medal 
  Luzon Anti-Dissidence Campaign Medal
  Visayas Anti-Dissidence Campaign Medal
  Disaster Relief and Rehabilitation Operations Ribbon
  Combat Commander's Badge (Philippines)
  AFP Parachutist Badge 
  Scout Ranger Qualification Badge
  National Defense College of the Philippines Seal Badge
 Army Transformation Roadmap Badge

Personal life
Lieutenant General Miranda is married to Caroline Miranda and the pair have four children, namely Charmaine Anne, Christine Andrea, Glen Carlo, and Guian Christopher.

References 

1961 births
Chairmen of the Joint Chiefs (Philippines)
Benigno Aquino III administration personnel
Filipino generals
Living people
People from San Fernando, La Union
Philippine Army generals
Philippine Military Academy alumni
Recipients of the Distinguished Conduct Star
Recipients of the Distinguished Service Star
Recipients of the Gold Cross (Philippines)
Recipients of the Bronze Cross Medal
Recipients of the Military Commendation Medal
Recipients of the Military Merit Medal (Philippines)
Duterte administration personnel